The 36th General Assembly of Prince Edward Island was in session from February 2, 1908, to December 5, 1911. The Liberal Party led by Francis Haszard formed the government. After Haszard accepted an appointment to the province's Supreme Court, Herbert James Palmer became Liberal party leader and Premier in May 1911; when he ran for reelection on November 15, 1911, he was defeated and the Liberals lost their majority, forcing an election.

There were three sessions of the 36th General Assembly:

Matthew Smith was elected speaker.

Members

Kings

Prince

Queens

Notes:

External links
  Election results for the Prince Edward Island Legislative Assembly, 1908-11-18
 Canadian Parliamentary Guide, 1912, EJ Chambers

Terms of the General Assembly of Prince Edward Island
1908 establishments in Prince Edward Island
1911 disestablishments in Prince Edward Island